A wild peach is a wild growing form of the Peach (Prunus persica).

Wild peach may also refer to other flowering tree plants not closely related to the peach or each other:
Kiggelaria africana, native to southern and eastern Africa
Santalum acuminatum, also known as Quandong, a hemiparasitic plant widely dispersed throughout the central deserts and southern areas of Australia
Terminalia carpentariae, native to northern Australia

See also
Wild Peach Village, Texas